Al-Sarafand was a Palestinian Arab village near the Mediterranean shore south of Haifa. In Ottoman tax records, it is shown that the village had a population of 61 inhabitants in 1596. According to a land and population survey by Sami Hadawi, al-Sarafand's population was 290 in 1945, entirely Arab.

History
Pottery remains from the late Roman era and Byzantine era have been found here.

Al-Sarafand was known to the Crusaders as Sarepta Yudee, but is not known when the village was founded, or how the name originated. The site was recaptured by Ayyubid forces in 1187-1188. The village appears in the waqf of the tomb (turba) and madrasa of amir Qurqamaz in Egypt.

Ottoman era
From Ottoman records it is known that in 1596 Sarafand was a village in the nahiya ("subdistrict") of Shafa, ( liwa' ("district") of Lajjun), with a population of 11 Muslim households, an estimated 61 persons. Villagers paid a fixed tax-rate of 25% to the authorities for the crops that they cultivated, which included wheat, barley, summer crops such as corn, beans, melons, and vegetables, and raising goats; a total of 8,500 akçe.

In 1799, it appeared as the village Sarfend on the map that Pierre Jacotin compiled that year.
In 1859 the village of Sarafand was described as being situated on a ridge between a plain and the beach. Consul Rogers estimated that 150 people lived in it and cultivated 16 faddans. Four years later, Victor Guérin stated that the population size was not exceeding 300.

According to the PEF's Survey of Western Palestine, who visited in 1873; "North of this village there is a system of rock- cut tombs, sixteen in all. Eight have each three loculi under arcosolia, and in three cases the rolling stones which closed the doors lie beside them. One of these stones was 3 feet diameter, and 1 foot thick, weighing probably about 6 cwt. Five of the tombs are single loculi, open in front, cut in the face of the cliff under arcosolia; two of the tombs have only two loculi each, and one is blocked up. This group presents the best examples found by the Survey party of the rolling stone arrangement for a tomb door."

A population list from about 1887 showed that Sarafand had about 270 inhabitants; all Muslims.

British Mandate era
In the 1922 census of Palestine, conducted by the British Mandate authorities, Sarafand had a population of 204; all Muslims, decreasing in the 1931 census to 188; still all Muslim, in a total of 38 houses.

The village economy depended on agriculture, animal husbandry and salt making.

In the 1945 statistics, the village had a population of 290 Muslims, and the village's lands spanned 5,409 dunams. The population was entirely Muslim. A total of 3,244 dunums of land was allocated to cereals; 22 dunums were irrigated or used for orchards, while 6 dunams were built-up (urban) land.

1948, and aftermath
During the 1947–1948 civil war in Mandatory Palestine, the inhabitants fled in several stages. Most fled in early May towards al-Tira and when al-Tira was depopulated they left for Jenin. Some returned and remained in al-Sarafand until Israeli forces — composed of the Carmeli and Alexandroni Brigades — assaulted the village on July 16, 1948. At the time, Arab Liberation Army volunteers and local militia were defending al-Sarafand. Most of the inhabitants fled to the southeast line of Wadi Ara, where the Iraqi Army was stationed. Later, they crossed the Jordan River, and since then the majority of al-Sarafand’s refugees have been living in Jordan. Only one former resident of al-Sarafand remained in Israel. The village houses were not immediately demolished by the Israelis and remained empty for many years. When they were eventually destroyed, the mosque was the only building spared.

Petersen inspected the village mosque and adjacent vaults in 1994, and described the mosque as "a tall rectangular box-like building standing on a terrace near the top of the ridge on which it was built. The mosque is entered through a doorway in the middle of the north wall. The interior is divided into two long cross-vaulted bays resting on six large piers. There are four windows in west wall facing the sea. The mihrab is placed in the centre of the south wall and can be seen on the exterior as a rectangular projection. To the west of the mihrab are the remains of a minbar (now destroyed). The lower sections of the wall are approximately 1 m. thick, whilst the upper part of the south and north walls are considerably thinner (0.3 m.). Although the present building does not appear to be very old (late nineteenth or early twentieth centuries) it does appear to in incorporate an earlier structure which is visible in the exterior walls. To the south of the mosque is a rectangular area of ruins (approximately 30m x 40m) containing several barrel-vaulted chambers. Three of these are still accessible; one on the north side nearest the mosque, and two on the south side next to the quarry cliff. Each vault is about 7m long; one is 2.52m wide and the other is 3.52m wide. More intensive investigation could reveal a basic plan of this structure."

Mosque restoration
In 1999, the 'Aqsa Society for the Preservation of Islamic Holy Sites decided to restore al-Sarafand’s mosque. In May 2000, while restoration was on the verge of completion, the mosque was destroyed overnight by a bulldozer. The perpetrator was never identified. The activists covered the ruins by a large tent and maintained a vigil at the site. Removal of the tent was negotiated with the Israeli authorities. It was agreed that the site would be fenced to protect it, but that did not happen and the activists built a more permanent structure. The latter was demolished by the police in March 2002, but the ruined mosque continues to be used for Friday prayers. According to the Or Commission report, Israeli authorities did not grant a license for rebuilding the mosque after the demolition; a decision that contributed to the souring of relations between local Muslim residents and the authorities. The Or Commission report also claims that activities by Islamic organizations such as the aforementioned society may be using religious pretenses to further political aims. The commission describes such actions as a factor in 'inflaming' the Muslim population in Israel against the authorities, and cites the Sarafand mosque episode, with Muslims' attempts to restore the mosque and Jewish attempts to stop them, as an example of the 'shifting of dynamics' of the relationship between Muslims and the Israeli authorities.

See also
 Depopulated Palestinian locations in Israel

References

Bibliography

Abu Shama (d.1267) (1969): Livre des deux jardins ("The Book of Two Gardens"). Recueil des Historiens des Croisades, Cited in Petersen (2001).

 (pp. 123, 100, 124, 126)
 

 

 

MPF: Ipsirli and al-Tamimi (1982): The Muslim Pious Foundations and Real Estates in Palestine. Gazza, Al-Quds al-Sharif, Nablus and Ajlun Districts according to 16th-Century Ottoman Tahrir Registers, Organisation of Islamic Conference, Istanbul 1402/1982. Cited in Petersen (2002).

External links
Welcome to al-Sarafand
al-Sarafand, Zochrot
Survey of Western Palestine, Map 7: IAA, Wikimedia commons 
Sarafand, at Khalil Sakakini Cultural Center
Sarafand, Dr. Moslih Kanaaneh

District of Haifa
Arab villages depopulated during the 1948 Arab–Israeli War